Ti Theloune Ta Matia Sou (Greek: Τι Θέλουνε Τα Μάτια Σου; English: What Want Your Eyes) is the first EP by Greek artist, Katy Garbi. It was released on 15 December 2000 by Sony Music Greece and received platinum certification, selling over 30,000 units. It contains three songs and two remixes of title track.

In 2000, platinum was the EP whose sales exceeded 25,000 units.

Track listing

Singles 

Two singles were officially released to radio stations and gained a lot of airplay.

"Ti Theloune Ta Matia Sou"

The title track was the lead single and released on 15 December 2000 alongside the EP. The song is a rock ballad featuring rock band, Exis. It was followed by a club mix which released with music video, directed by Kostas Kapetanidis. In producing the video, Sony Music used the remix which was found to be more audience-friendly, in that it was upbeat and signature of music at that time period. Although the club mix, which was the work of Dimitris Paizis, did not feature Exis. The film clip and track became a hit on the charts and received accolades. It was shot in October 2000 and released shortly thereafter, showcasing Katy in many different abstract scenes and theming.

"Aspro I Mavro"

"Aspro I Mavro" was the second and last single and released on 30 March 2001. The song is a cover of the 1996 Algerian song "Harramt Ahebbak" and is a dance tsifteteli which has success until today.

Credits 
Credits adapted from liner notes.

Personnel 
 Bolivar – programming, keyboards (tracks: 4)
 Akis Diximos – backing vocals (tracks: 3)
 Giorgos Fotopoulos – drums (tracks: 1)
 Antonis Gounaris – orchestration, programming, keyboards (tracks: 3)
 Anna Ioannidou – backing vocals (tracks: 3)
 Manolis Karantinis – bouzouki, baglama (tracks: 2)
 Katerina Kiriakou – backing vocals (tracks: 3)
 Spiros Kontakis – orchestration, guitars (tracks: 1)
 Babis Laskarakis – guitars (tracks: 2)
 Dimitris Paizis – programming, keyboards (tracks: 5)
 Giannis Saroglou – bass, second vocal (tracks: 2)
 Soumka – programming, keyboards (tracks: 1, 4)
 Kostas Tournas – orchestration (tracks: 2)
 Filippos Tsemperoulis – flute (tracks: 2)
 Petros Xourafas – programming, keyboards (tracks: 2)
 Barry Zealey – bass (tracks: 1)

Production 

 Christos Avdelas (C&C studio) – sound engineer, mix engineer (tracks: 1, 4)
 Dimitris Chorianopoulos (Workshop studio) – sound engineer, mix engineer (tracks: 5)
 Thodoris Chrisanthopoulos (Fabelsound) – mastering
 Ntinos Diamantopoulos – photographer
 Giannis Doulamis – production manager
 Lefteris Neromiliotis (Sofita studio) – sound engineer, mix engineer (tracks: 3)
 Christos Peltekis (City studio) – editing (tracks: 2)
 Dimitris Rekouniotis – art direction
 Katerina Sideridou – cover processing
 Soumka (C&C studio) – sound engineer, mix engineer (tracks: 1, 4)
 Giannis Tountas (City studio) – sound engineer, mix engineer (tracks: 2)

Charts
Ti Theloune Ta Matia Sou made its debut at number 2 on the 'Greece Top 50 Singles' charts.

After 22 weeks on the charts, it was certified platinum by IFPI.

References

2000 debut EPs
Greek-language albums
Katy Garbi albums
Music videos directed by Kostas Kapetanidis